Octenyl succinic acid modified gum Arabic is known to the FAO as a food additive. It has E number E423, and is a chemical modification of gum arabic.

Synopsis

It is a free flowing powder at STP, and has off-white to light tan colour. It has functionality as an emulsifier and is freely soluble in water.

References

E-number additives